The M.J. Lavina Robidoux House in Aurora, Colorado is an Italianate house built in 1913.  It was listed on the National Register of Historic Places in 2011. Constructed in 1913, the Robidoux House is a one-and-a-half-story, cross-gabled brick bungalow and is an excellent example of the Craftsman architectural style. The city of Aurora, Colorado, has very few
examples of Craftsman brick bungalows that are left in the area, making this house particularly significant.

History
Mary Jane Lavina Girard Robidoux, the widow of Albert Robidoux, a successful wheat farmer and rancher from Kansas, commissioned the construction of the house at 1615 Galena Street in 1913. Mrs. Robidoux moved to Aurora, Colorado, following her husband's untimely death in 1912. Mrs. Robidoux had adequate financial resources and invested in the design and construction of one of the finest Craftsman-style brick bungalows in Aurora. It is no surprise Mrs. Robidoux wanted her new home to be located on Aurora's most affluent street: “Silk Stocking Row” as it was referred. According to the Aurora Democrat dated October 3, 1913, the Robidoux House was “finest house yet erected in Aurora.”
There have only been four families including Mrs. Robidoux, who have resided at 1615 Galena Street and much still remains of the original house. Mrs. Robidoux died in her home in June1 929. She left the house to St. Clara's Orphanage as a memorial to her late husband Albert. The rest of her estate was split up between nieces, nephews, and surviving siblings. St. Clara's Orphanage sold the house to the Cornelius Muldoon family in 1930. The Muldoons lovingly cared for the woodwork for over 60 years (from 1930 to 1996). It was said that the matriarch of the family, Clare Muldoon, never allowed anything other than cheesecloth to be used for dusting. In the 1940s, this house had the highest assessed value of any residence in Aurora. St. Clara's Orphanage sold the house to the Cornelius Muldoon family in 1930. Mr. Muldoon became sick in World War I from mustard gas and sought medical help as a disabled veteran from the Fitzsimons Army Hospital in Aurora. The Muldoons had two young sons who still live in the neighborhood today, Neil and Felix. They tell stories about how their mother was so grateful to have the lovely home that she took great care of it and would not allow them to scuff any of the woodwork. During the Depression, their mother served bread and soup out of the back porch to men passing through from the railway station looking for work. Mrs. Muldoon died in 1984, after which a family member moved in and lived in the house until 1996. The family sold it to non-family members at this time. In 2007, the current owners bought the house and completed some minor restoration of the wood floors and staircase damaged over the years. They also remodeled the kitchen to modernize it, but saved the old sink, which is kept in the basement along with what appears to be the original stove and clothes washing machine. A large kitchen buffet moved to the back porch is still used today.

See also
National Register of Historic Places listings in Adams County, Colorado

References

External links

Houses in Aurora, Colorado
Houses on the National Register of Historic Places in Colorado
Houses completed in 1913
Houses in Arapahoe County, Colorado
1913 establishments in Colorado
National Register of Historic Places in Arapahoe County, Colorado